Spain women's national roller hockey team is the national team side of Spain at international roller hockey (quad). It is one of the best teams of the world and has been dominating both the Rink Hockey World Championship with a record (4 titles) and the Rink Hockey European Championship (3 titles) in the last decade.

Titles
Women's Roller Hockey World Cup (7): 1994, 1996, 2000, 2008, 2016, 2017, 2019
European Women's Roller Hockey Championship (6): 1995, 2009, 2011, 2013, 2015, 2018

Competitive record

World Championship

European Championship

Current squad
Squad for the 2017 World Cup.

Source:

See also
 Spain national roller hockey team

References

External links

Women's
Roller hockey
National roller hockey (quad) teams
European national roller hockey (quad) teams